Semily District is a district (okres) within the Liberec Region of the Czech Republic. Its capital is the town of Semily.

List of municipalities
Bělá - 
Benecko - 
Benešov u Semil - 
Bozkov - 
Bradlecká Lhota - 
Bukovina u Čisté - 
Bystrá nad Jizerou - 
Chuchelna - 
Čistá u Horek - 
Háje nad Jizerou - 
Holenice -
Horka u Staré Paky - 
Horní Branná - 
Hrubá Skála - 
Jablonec nad Jizerou - 
Jesenný - 
Jestřabí v Krkonoších - 
Jilemnice - 
Kacanovy - 
Karlovice - 
Klokočí - 
Košťálov - 
Kruh - 
Ktová - 
Levínská Olešnice - 
Libštát - 
Lomnice nad Popelkou - 
Loučky - 
Martinice v Krkonoších - 
Mírová pod Kozákovem - 
Modřišice - 
Mříčná - 
Nová Ves nad Popelkou - 
Ohrazenice - 
Olešnice - 
Paseky nad Jizerou - 
Peřimov - 
Poniklá - 
Přepeře - 
Příkrý - 
Radostná pod Kozákovem - 
Rakousy - 
Rokytnice nad Jizerou - 
Roprachtice - 
Rovensko pod Troskami - 
Roztoky u Jilemnice - 
Roztoky u Semil - 
Semily - 
Slaná - 
Stružinec - 
Studenec - 
Svojek - 
Syřenov - 
Tatobity - 
Troskovice - 
Turnov - 
Veselá - 
Víchová nad Jizerou - 
Vítkovice - 
Všeň - 
Vyskeř - 
Vysoké nad Jizerou - 
Záhoří - 
Žernov

External links
List of towns and villages of the Semily District

References

 
Districts of the Czech Republic